Francine D'Amour (born November 6, 1946) is a Quebec educator and writer.

The daughter of Jean D'Amour and Marthe Pinard, she was born in Beauharnois and studied modern literature at the Université de Nice and French literature at the University of Ottawa. D'Amour has taught at a number of CEGEPs in Quebec, including the Collège Montmorency in Laval.

She published her first novel Les Dimanches sont mortels in 1987; it received the Grand Prix littéraire Guérin and the Prix de l'Académie des lettres du Québec. Her second novel Les Jardins de l'enfer was a finalist for the prize awarded by the readers of Elle (France). D'Amour has contributed to several literary journals such as Arcade, Les écrits, Le Sabord and Moebius.

D'Amour has been invited to various literary festivals, book fairs and literary conferences in Canada, the United States, France and Morocco.

Selected works 
 Écrire comme un chat, stories (1994) 
 Presque rien, novel (1996), received the Prix Québec-Paris

References 

1946 births
Living people
Canadian novelists in French
Canadian short story writers in French
Canadian women novelists
Canadian women short story writers
20th-century Canadian novelists
20th-century Canadian women writers
21st-century Canadian novelists
21st-century Canadian women writers
People from Greater Montreal
Writers from Quebec
Côte d'Azur University alumni
University of Ottawa alumni
20th-century Canadian short story writers
People from Beauharnois, Quebec
21st-century Canadian short story writers